The Maserati 5000 GT is a 2-door coupé car, made by Italian automobile manufacturer Maserati from 1959–1966. A total of thirty-four were produced with bodies made by eight different Italian coach builders.

The first car in the Tipo 103 series was the Shah of Persia, delivered to Mohammad Reza Pahlavi, who had been impressed by the Maserati 3500 after a test drive but demanded a more exclusive car for himself. He commissioned Maserati's chief engineer Giulio Alfieri to fit a slightly modified 5-litre engine from the Maserati 450S in the 3500GT's chassis. Carrozzeria Touring developed the superleggera tubing and aluminium body of the two-seater coupé. The second car, also a Shah of Persia by Touring, was displayed at the 1959 Salone dell'automobile di Torino.

In 2018, Carrozzeria Touring Superleggera announced the creation of a homage to the 5000 GT with a Maserati GranTurismo-based Sciàdipersia. A total of 25 cars were made (coupé and cabriolet combined).

History
In an attempt to revive sales, Omar Orsi, the son of then Maserati owner Adolfo Orsi, mailed sales brochures of the 3500 GT and the 450S to prospective wealthy buyers. One brochure was also mailed to the Shah of Iran who scheduled a meeting with Maserati management in late 1958. After taking a test drive in a 3500 GT, the Shah requested Giulio Alfieri to make a road car combining the usability of the 3500 GT with the power of the 450S and offered to fund the development and build costs. The engine received little modifications for road usage, those being an increased displacement of 4,937 cc and a reduced compression ratio of 8.5:1. The chassis of the 3500 GT was strengthened to better handle the power of the new V8 engine but some components from the 3500 GT remained; the independent live axles and the braking system were carried over.

Initially, Bertone was chosen as the coach builder for the body but Carrozzeria Touring was ultimately chosen at the behest of Orsi. The coach builder was given instructions to make the car look distinct from the 3500 GT it was based on. Chief designer Carlo Anderloni used the Persian Baroque architecture as inspiration for the unique grille design and the interior design. The finished car was immediately shipped to the Shah of Iran with little to no exposure to the public. A second car was built to be displayed at the 1959 Turin Motor show which was bought by South African millionaire and Kyalami track owner Basil Read.

The new engine developed . The fuel injected 5000 GT was shown at the 1960 Salone di Torino. A new 5-speed ZF transaxle was added with an overdrive gear to better cope with the modifications and ventilated disc brakes were added all around.

Specifications
Specifications for the first 5000 GT were:
Maserati 450S-derived four OHC  V8,  at 5,500 rpm
Lucas mechanical injection or four 45 DCOE Weber carburettors and dual fuel pump
mechanical Magneti-Marelli ignition, dual spark plug
4-speed manual transmission ZF (later 5-speed)
Front discs, rear drums (later all discs)

Coachbuilders
After the first body by Touring, the main body partner since 1960 became Carrozzeria Allemano which did 22 of the cars, designed by Giovanni Michelotti. Other builders were Pietro Frua (3), Carrozzeria Monterosa (2), Pininfarina (1), Ghia (Sergio Sartorelli) (1), Giovanni Michelotti (1), Bertone (Giorgetto Giugiaro) (1) and Carrozzeria Touring (2 more).

In 1961, Bertone built a one-off 5000 GT that featured a body designed by Giorgetto Giugiaro. The car had a Tipo 104 chassis and a different engine than the standard 5000 GT.

Buyers
The 5000 GT was sold at prices around US$17,000 (twice the cost of a Maserati 3500), and in many respects individualized to the desires of its celebrity buyers, including Karim Aga Khan, Italian industrialist Gianni Agnelli, American sportsman Briggs Cunningham, actor Stewart Granger, Italian businessman Ferdinando Innocenti (Ghia-bodied 5000 GT), South African construction magnate Basil Read, Swiss entrepreneur Otto Nef, count Giuseppe Comola, American Musician Joe Walsh, and Mexican president Adolfo López Mateos.

Further reading
Maurice Khawam, Maserati 5000 GT - A Significant Automobile. .
Maurizio Tabucchi, Nel segno del Tridente. .

References

External links

maserati-alfieri.co.uk - The 5000GT

5000 GT
Rear-wheel-drive vehicles
Grand tourers
Cars introduced in 1959
1960s cars